Luxor Records is an American record label located in Los Angeles, California.

Background
Luxor Records was co-founded by Aaron Bridgewater (lead vocals) and Nick Morris (lead guitarist), of As They Sleep. The label was created to release the band's first album, Blacken the Sun, but later made it professional after signing bands such as It Lies Within and Forsake the Fallen. Later in 2012, the label signed Broken Flesh, a Christian metal of the extreme metal genre. More bands were signed throughout 2015–2016, such as The Order of Elijah, My Heart to Fear, Toarn, and From Blue to Gray.

Artists

Current
 As They Sleep
 Broken Flesh
 Dagon
 Emuness
 Forsake the Fallen
 From Blue to Gray
 A Hill to Die Upon
 Imminent Sonic Destruction
 It Lies Within
 Kaleido
 Motown Rage
 My Heart to Fear
 The Order of Elijah
 Primo Beats
 Read 'Em and Weep
 Scream Out Loud
  Dudes
 Syphilic
 Toarn
 Upon a Broken Throne

Former
 Cry Excess
 Duse Breed
 A Reason to Breathe
 Born With Open Eyes

References

American record labels
Heavy metal record labels